Patricia Morrissey is a former camogie (Irish women's stick-and-ball team sport) player, winner of the Elvery Cup for the short-lived ‘Miss Camogie’ award in 1971. From Quilty, County Clare, Co Clare, she played for the UCD Ashbourne Cup winning team and captained Dublin to the 1971 junior All Ireland title.

References

External links
 Camogie.ie Official Camogie Association Website
 On The Ball Official Camogie Magazine Issue 1 and issue 2

Living people
Clare camogie players
Year of birth missing (living people)
UCD camogie players